Mothers of East Los Angeles (MELA), started in 1986, as a group of Latina mothers to fight the proposed construction of a state prison in East Los Angeles by Governor George Deukmejian. Rosa Diseno, Lucy Ramos, Mary Lou Trevis and Aurora Castillo are some of the founding mothers among the 400-member group. Two organizations exist today who originate from the same founding members, one organization being the Mothers of East LA and the other being Madres de Este Los Angeles, Santa Isabel. Both groups are primarily focused on environmental justice because they are mothers who have coalesced around something of immediate importance to them, the safety of their families and children". They are known nationally for their victory over the proposed state prison in East L.A. which later lead MELA to take on many issues that have affected their environment and quality of life and has been unceasing in their dedication to protect their community from other projects they perceive as harmful.

Political history
East Los Angeles State Prison
The California Department of Corrections (CDC) was ordered by the California state legislators to build a prison in the Los Angeles County because of the disproportionate number of inmates that originated from the SoCal area. Plans regarding the site location had been under debate for three years prior to the announcement of a new prison in the region of East Los Angeles in March 1985. Many people were not aware until Assemblywoman Gloria Molina directed attention to the issue. Molina began to rally the support of organizations and coalitions which helped gain time for their movement to grow but was coming to a decisive point by September 1986. Not long before that a parish priest Monsignor John Moretta had become part of the prison opposition and gained certain prominence in the movement. He was responsible for naming the mothers as "Mothers of East L.A." MELA's involvement in the opposition for the prison created a greater sense of community, exposed the potential dangers that the prison could present to the existing mixed residential-industrial community, and gained major publicity protesting against the prison construction. When the prison came up for a vote in the summer of 1991, it failed by four votes.

Environmental Justice

Incinerator in Vernon
In 1987 California Thermal Treatment Systems announced that an incinerator was going "to be constructed in the heart of the South Coast Air Basin, in the city of Vernon, within  of homes, schools, churches, hospitals, and food processing facilities". The planning for this incinerator had been under the rug for two years before the news was announced. Assemblywoman Lucille Roybal-Allard quickly gathered support from the East LA community such as MELA and Greenpeace. They were able to organize protest marches, keep the community aware using their bilingual ties, and attend important hearings to make their voices publicly heard. MELA actively participated in the fight against the incinerator for several reasons: harmful health effects from probable increased air, pollution, environmental discrimination from large companies and failure for the Environmental Protection Agency and CTTS to undergo proper legal procedures. After a six-year battle, MELA sued the Environmental Protection Agency for failure to provide Environmental Impact Report prior to agreeing to the continuance of the project. In 1991 the incinerator project was abandoned due to high opposition from health risks and a change of a new conditional agreement which included "preparing an EIR, and to incorporate 'best available control technology’ (BACT), and update its health risk assessment".

Treatment plant
A few weeks after the victory over the incinerator project, ChemClear, a treatment plant for hazardous waste was proposed in the Huntington Park, California. MELA, Senator Al Torres, California Association of School Health Educators and other important groups played a critical role in petitioning and protesting against the plant. They rose issues against the facility location, an emergency contingency plan, waste minimization, fugitive emissions, methods of public outreach, and alternate transportation routes. In 1991, Chem Clear abandoned the project due to a recession. Nonetheless, MELA considered it a victory against yet another harmful project.

School air quality
In 2011, MELA began working on improving the air quality of 7 schools in Boyle Heights. This project is being funded through the $1 million grant from Reformulated Gasoline Fund. MELA's goal is to create a better environment for children because Los Angeles has a reputation for having bad air pollution.

Motherly activism
MELA transformed traditional networks, resources based on family, and Mexican American culture to defend their communities from injustices. They made important connections to the mother's role as selfless caregivers by using political activism as a tool to extend that care towards the community. They have also strived to be inclusive to non-mothers. Members from MELA often relate the conditions of their low income communities and their histories to be a strong factor in believing that they have the right to oppose state-proposed projects if they believe it is detrimental to the health of the community.

Allies
Mothers of East LA has worked alongside many other organizations that have fought for the quality of life in the community.

These organizations assist MELA in creating public improvement projects geared towards greater community.

Work during the 21st century
MELA's focuses on conservation programs like health education campaigns, raising money for scholarships, informing the community about environmental injustice through mass demonstrations, community and legal hearings.

In 2010 MELA has been involved fighting against the proposed CVS Pharmacy in place of the historic Golden Gate Theater which was built in 1927. MELA argued that the construction of a CVS could have hazardous environmental effects and increase the alcohol selling/buying ratio. However, East Los Angeles Association (ELARA) stated that "it would mean critical revenue for any future city of East Los Angeles." The Board of supervisors allowed the conversion of the theater to CVS store.

References

Further reading

 The archives of Mothers of East Los Angeles are held in the University Library at California State University, Northridge.

Hispanic and Latino American culture in California
Hispanic and Latino American organizations
Organizations based in Los Angeles
History of women in California